Alma Negra is a mountain in the Cordillera de la Ramada range of the Andes Mountains, in Argentina.

The first ascent of the mountain was by a Polish expedition in 1934, when a cairn was erected on the summit.

In 2022, Austrian climber Christian Stangl reached the summit of Alma Negra on a new route from the south side in a solo ascend.

See also
List of mountains in the Andes

Notes

Mountains of Argentina